Cerambycinus dubius is a species of Jurassic beetle in the family Cerambycidae, and the only species in the genus Cerambycinus. It is known from Solnhofen Limestone. It was described by Münster in 1839. Its body length was about 2 cm.

References

†
Fossil taxa described in 1839
Extinct beetles